Oonch Neech (or Oonch Neech ka Papada) is a rural and urban street children's game and variation of Tag game played of North India and Pakistan. Oonch Neech (Hindi) translates Up and Down in English.

In Andhra Pradesh, it is played in the name of Nela Banda, (Telugu:నేల-బండ) which is now extinct owing to urbanization and western influence. This game needs at least 4 or more kids. A place where you will find footpath or jogging lane or some surface higher than the level of grass is ideal to play this game.

In Maharashtra, it is played as  Dagad ka Maati (Marathi: दगड़ का माती) literally meaning "Stone or Sand"

In Ouch nich if the dener says nich all players have to go some place high of he says ouch then all players have to says down whatever the dener picks he has to stay on that platform

Terms
Oonch: means an area higher than the ground level or simply Upper Level. Neech: means the ground area or the lower surface area or simply Lower Level. Danner: The person who will catch the other members who are playing.

Overview
After a chain-cut, a person, say A is chosen as Danner or catcher. The playing members will ask the Danner : 'Oonch neech ka papada—Oonch mangi ki  neech?' means what you want the upper level or the lower level. The catcher chooses either Oonch (any height) or Neech (ground). Usually he chooses Neech, so as to move. Once A chooses Oonch, he should not step on Neech by any means and on the other hand, he will not let other players to step on his ground. If B stays on ground by mistake and if he is captured by A, then B becomes the catcher in the next game.

In the game, other players tease the catcher by saying "Hum tumhari Neech pe or Hum tumhari Oonch pe" which mean "We're in your area, catch us". In Telugu, it is translated as "Nee nelanta pappu suddha" or "Nee bandanta pappu suddha". The catcher is asked by the players "Which area do you want? Oonch (up) or Neech (down)?". The catcher chooses the area as per his convenience.

In Marathi while giving the choice to the Danner recite the following poem

"Kora Kagad Nili Shai,A
Konhala Bhit Nahi.
Sanga Tumcha Nav kay,
Dagad Ka Maati?"

In Devnagri:
""कोरा कागद नीली शाई, अम्ही कुनला भेत नाही।
सांगा तुमच नाव काय, दगड की माती?""

In popular culture
The game lent its name to the title of a 1989 Bollywood film, Oonch Neech Beech  (1989), starring Sanjeev Kumar and Shabana Azmi.

See also
 Stapu

References

External links
 Up and Down (Oonch Neech)

Children's games
Street games
Indian games
Tag variants
Pakistani games